Norman Simmons (1915–2004) was a DNA research pioneer.

Simmons worked with Elkan Blout on proteins and polypeptides and was also recognized for isolating a structurally pure form of DNA. This was, in fact, the DNA which Rosalind Franklin used in her X-ray diffraction studies that rewarded Maurice Wilkins, James Watson and Francis Crick with the Nobel Prize for the double helix model of DNA. In his Nobel Prize lecture of 1962, Wilkins thanked Simmons "for having refined techniques of isolating DNA, and thereby helping a great many workers including ourselves."

References

External links
In Memoriam: Norman Simmons on University of California website
 

American molecular biologists
American biochemists
American dentists
1915 births
2004 deaths
American dentistry academics
20th-century dentists